The General Electric J85 is a small single-shaft turbojet engine. It is one of GE's most successful and longest in service military jet engines, with the civilian versions having logged over 16.5 million hours of operation. The United States Air Force plans to continue using the J85 in aircraft through 2040. Civilian models, known as the CJ610, are similar but supplied without an afterburner and are identical to non-afterburning J85 variants, while the CF700 adds a rear-mounted fan for improved fuel economy.

Design and development
The J85 was originally designed to power a large decoy missile, the McDonnell ADM-20 Quail. The Quail was designed to be released from a B-52 Stratofortress in-flight and fly for long distances in formation with the launch aircraft, multiplying the number of targets facing the SA-2 surface-to-air missile operators on the ground. This mission demanded a small engine that could nevertheless provide enough power to keep up with the jet bomber. Like the similar Armstrong Siddeley Viper being built in England, the engine on a Quail drone had no need to last for extended periods of time, so therefore could be built of low-quality materials.

The fit was a success on the Quail, but again like the Viper it was later built with normal grade materials and subsequently used to power small jet aircraft, including the Northrop T-38 Talon, Northrop F-5, Canadair CT-114 Tutor, and Cessna A-37 Dragonfly light attack aircraft. More recently, J85s have powered the Scaled Composites White Knight aircraft, the carrier for the Scaled Composites SpaceShipOne spacecraft, and the Me 262 Project.

Several variants were produced.

The most advanced variant in the J85 series is the J85-21 model designed specifically for the F-5E/F during its development process.

The J85-21 design replaces AM 355 chromium nickel molybdenum stainless steel alloy, used by previous J85 models for compressor rotors and blades, with a titanium alloy.

More than 12,000 J85 engines had been built by the time production ended in 1988.

Iranian reverse engineering

The Iranian Ministry of Defense constructed a new engine based on the General Electric J85-GE-21B named "OWJ" and presented it at a defense exhibition on 22 August 2016.

Variants

J85-GE-1 thrust
J85-GE-2 thrust
J85-GE-3 thrust
J85-GE-4 thrust
J85-GE-5 thrust,  afterburning thrust
J85-GE-5A afterburning thrust
J85-GE-7 thrust
J85-GE-12
J85-GE-13,  thrust
J85-GE-15 afterburning thrust
J85-CAN-15Orenda manufactured J85-GE-15 for the Canadair CF-116  thrust
J85-GE-17A thrust
J85-GE-19
J85-GE-21A military thrust;  afterburning thrust.
J85-GE-J1A thrust
J85-GE-J2 thrust.
J85-GE-J4
J85-CAN-40Manufactured by Orenda for the Canadair CT-114 Tutor,  thrust

Applications

 Bell X-14A/B
 Boom XB-1 demonstrator
 Canadair CT-114 Tutor
 Canadair CF-5
 Cessna A-37 Dragonfly
 HESA Yasin (without afterburner)
 HESA Kowsar (with afterburner)
 Fairchild C-123 Provider
 Fairchild AC-119K
 Fiat G.91Y
 Lockheed Have Blue
 McDonnell ADM-20 Quail decoy missile
 North American Rockwell OV-10 Bronco - OV-10B(Z) target tug variant, the engine in addition to its turboprops
 North American T-2 Buckeye
 Northrop F-5
 Northrop T-38 Talon
 Ryan MQM-34D Mod II target drone
 Ryan XV-5 Vertifan
 Saab 105Ö
 Scaled Composites White Knight

Other

 American Challenge water speed record jet-powered boat - Two J85-GE-21s
 Hermeus experimental turbine-based combined cycle “Chimera” turboramjet engine - J85-21 turbojet core

Specifications (J85-GE-21)

See also

References

External links

GE J85 product page
J85 picture
"G.E.'s Small Turbojet" a 1959 Flight article

J85
1950s turbojet engines